Snooker world rankings 2000/2001: The professional world rankings for the top 64 snooker players in the 2000–01 season are listed below.

References

2000
Rankings 2001
Rankings 2000